Nurunnabi Chowdhury (born 1 December 1968) is a Bangladesh Awami League politician and the incumbent member of parliament from Bhola-3.

Education
Chowdhury completed his BBA and MBA degrees.

Career
Awami League candidate Major (retired) Jashimuddin was elected to parliament for Bhola-3 in the 2008 Bangladeshi general election. The seat was vacated in 2010 as the result of a Supreme Court ruling. A by-election was called for Bhola-3, which was won by Bangladesh Awami League candidate Chowdhury on 29 April 2010, against Major Hafizuddin Ahmed of the Bangladesh Nationalist Party.

Chowdhury was re-elected in 2014, and 2018 as the MP of Bhola-3.

Controversy
Ibrahim Ahmed died after being shot with a gun belonging to Chowdhury in August 2010. Chowdhury's driver Kala filed an unnatural death case with the police and claimed Ibrahim accidentally shot himself while handling the gun in the MP's car. The Detective Branch of the police suspected foul play. On 19 August 2010, Ibrahim's brother filed a murder case against Chowdhury and 17 others with a court in Dhaka. On 12 January 2012, the Criminal Investigation Department pressed murder charges against six. The accused included Chowhury's driver, bodyguard, personal secretary, and three members of the Jubo League, but excluded Nurunnabi Chowdhury.

References

Living people
1968 births
Awami League politicians
11th Jatiya Sangsad members
10th Jatiya Sangsad members
9th Jatiya Sangsad members
Place of birth missing (living people)